Kenneth Royal Williams (born April 6, 1964) is a former outfielder in Major League Baseball and the current Executive Vice President of the Chicago White Sox.

Playing career
The Tigers waived him during the  season, and he was claimed by the Toronto Blue Jays. Williams remained a bit player with the Blue Jays, usually coming on as a pinch-runner due to his speed. He was the starting center fielder when Dave Stieb threw his only no-hitter, the first no-hitter in Toronto history. He is best remembered as a player for a bizarre incident during the 1990 season, where a series of wild throwing errors resulted in him (on base as a pinch-runner) rounding third base and mauling over third base coach John McLaren, knocking him out in the process (Williams himself was winded, but eventually ended up scoring the run). This humorous clip would be played over and over in blooper reels for years to come. The Blue Jays then put him on waivers during the  season, with Canada's other major league team, the Montreal Expos, picking him up. Williams decided to retire from baseball after being released by Montreal following the 1991 season.

Administrative career
In November , Williams rejoined the White Sox organization as a scout. In , he was named vice-president of player development, a position in which he remained until .

General manager
In October 2000, Williams replaced Ron Schueler as the general manager of the White Sox. Williams inherited Jerry Manuel as his first manager, who had just led them to 95 wins and a division title prior to Williams being promoted to GM. At the conclusion of the 2003 season Manuel was fired despite a winning record of 86–76. Since becoming the White Sox GM, Williams has become known for his aggressive moves to bolster the Sox lineup. This reputation was strengthened following the  season, when Williams completely made over the White Sox team by switching its on-field focus from home runs to pitching, defense, and speed. Accordingly, he acquired players which excelled in those areas, through free agent signings (Orlando Hernández, Dustin Hermanson, Jermaine Dye, A. J. Pierzynski, Tadahito Iguchi), trades (Scott Podsednik, José Contreras, Freddy García) and the farm system (Joe Crede, Aaron Rowand). Both Crede and Rowand were drafted by Schueler. Williams' off-season maneuvers were reflected in an extremely successful  campaign for the South Siders, one in which they held the best record in all of baseball for most of the year, and finished with the best record in the AL to clinch their first AL Central Division title since 2000, their first American League pennant since 1959, and their first World Series since 1917.

In the off-season prior to the 2006 season, Williams set out to improve his world championship team further by acquiring pitcher Javier Vázquez from the Arizona Diamondbacks and slugger Jim Thome from the Philadelphia Phillies. In addition, Williams was cognizant of the large role that the bench played under Ozzie Guillén and solidified it by trading for Rob Mackowiak and Alex Cintrón. Because of these maneuvers, the White Sox were once again favored to win the 2006 American League Central. At the All-Star break, the White Sox were tied with the Detroit Tigers for first place and held a 6-game lead over the New York Yankees for the wild card. The lead evaporated in the second half of the season and despite winning 90 games, they fell short and finished in third place in their Division behind the Detroit Tigers and Minnesota Twins, thereby not making the playoffs.

In the offseason before the  season, Williams traded away Freddy García to the Phillies and acquired prospects, Gavin Floyd and Gio González, in return. He also signed veteran free agent Darin Erstad to a one-year, $1 million contract. Williams has also stated that the team needs to get younger and improve its scouting. In early January 2008, he traded Gio González, Fautino de los Santos, and Ryan Sweeney for Nick Swisher.

With pitcher Jake Peavy being acquired at the trade deadline for the 2009 season, Williams was referred to by Gordon Edes of Yahoo Sports as a "stealth bomber" for his under the radar moves.
On August 10, Williams made another under-the-radar move, by claiming OF Alex Ríos off the waivers from the Toronto Blue Jays. On September 29, 2011, Ozzie Guillén was traded to the Miami Marlins, along with minor league pitcher Ricardo Andres. The Marlins assumed the last year on Guillen's contract, in exchange for minor league pitchers Jhan Marinez and Osvaldo Martinez. On October 6, 2011, Kenny Williams hired Robin Ventura as the new manager of the Chicago White Sox.

On October 26, 2012, Williams was promoted to Executive Vice President of the Chicago White Sox while Assistant GM Rick Hahn was promoted to General Manager.

On December 6, 2016, Williams oversaw the trade in which he sent Chris Sale to Boston Red Sox for Michael Kopech, Yoan Moncada and Luis Basabe.

Personal life
Kenny resides in Naperville, Illinois. He has 5 children: entrepreneur TeMeka C. Williams, former Professional Scout for the White Sox Dedrick Q. Williams, former Wichita State University baseball player Kenny Williams, Jr. (a 2008 draftee of the White Sox) and now scout for the Arizona Diamondbacks, former Kansas City Chiefs wide receiver Kyle Williams (also a 2006 draftee of the White Sox), and Tyler Williams, who attended Chaparral High School in Scottsdale, Arizona (the same High school as White Sox first baseman Paul Konerko). Tyler is currently playing in the Chicago White Sox Farm System as a first baseman for the class A affiliate Kannapolis Intimidators.  Kenny also has one granddaughter.  Kenny Williams is currently remarried.  Williams wed television journalist Zoraida Sambolin in July 2014. Williams has two new stepchildren, Sambolin's son Nicolas and daughter Sofia.

References

External links

Kenny Williams at Baseball Gauge
Venezuelan Professional Baseball League
Chicago White Sox official biography
Analysis from RealGMB.com

1964 births
Living people
African-American baseball players
African-American sports executives and administrators
American expatriate baseball players in Canada
American sports executives and administrators
Appleton Foxes players
Baseball players from Berkeley, California
Baseball players from Chicago
Baseball players from San Jose, California
Birmingham Barons players
Buffalo Bisons (minor league) players
Chicago White Sox executives
Chicago White Sox players
Chicago White Sox scouts
Denver Zephyrs players
Detroit Tigers players
Glens Falls White Sox players
Gulf Coast White Sox players
Hawaii Islanders players
Indianapolis Indians players
Leones del Caracas players
American expatriate baseball players in Venezuela
Major League Baseball executives
Major League Baseball general managers
Major League Baseball outfielders
Montreal Expos players
Stanford Cardinal football players
Stanford Cardinal baseball players
Syracuse Chiefs players
Toledo Mud Hens players
Toronto Blue Jays players
Vancouver Canadians players
21st-century African-American people
20th-century African-American sportspeople